Ōkato is a small town in rural Taranaki, New Zealand. It is situated about 25 minutes drive around the coast from New Plymouth on State Highway 45. Oakura is 12 km to the north-east, and Warea is 9 km to the south-west. The place offers popular rocky surfing spots around coastal beaches. The town was established as a military settlement in the 1860s.

While "Kato" was probably a personal name, an alternative translation is "place of full tide/tsunami". In July 2020, the name of the locality was officially gazetted as Ōkato by the New Zealand Geographic Board.

Ōkato has all the elements of a New Zealand rural community with sporting facilities (rugby grounds, bowling club, squash courts, tennis courts and swimming pool), Coastal Taranaki School, a police station, and a volunteer fire brigade.

Ōkato was also notable as the home of Okato Cheese which was manufactured by the Okato Co-operative Dairy Company.  This manufacturing site closed some years after merging with Egmont Co-operative Dairy. Activities in the Ōkato area include the Stony River walkway, which has a number of locations for photographing Mt Taranaki.

The rural community of Puniho is located just south of Ōkato.

Demographics

Ōkato had a population of 606 at the 2018 New Zealand census, an increase of 45 people (8.0%) since the 2013 census, and an increase of 75 people (14.1%) since the 2006 census. There were 228 households, comprising 291 males and 315 females, giving a sex ratio of 0.92 males per female, with 153 people (25.2%) aged under 15 years, 93 (15.3%) aged 15 to 29, 276 (45.5%) aged 30 to 64, and 84 (13.9%) aged 65 or older.

Ethnicities were 92.1% European/Pākehā, 23.8% Māori, 0.5% Pacific peoples, 0.5% Asian, and 1.5% other ethnicities. People may identify with more than one ethnicity.

Although some people chose not to answer the census's question about religious affiliation, 58.9% had no religion, 29.2% were Christian, 1.0% had Māori religious beliefs, 1.5% were Buddhist and 1.5% had other religions.

Of those at least 15 years old, 84 (18.5%) people had a bachelor's or higher degree, and 84 (18.5%) people had no formal qualifications. 30 people (6.6%) earned over $70,000 compared to 17.2% nationally. The employment status of those at least 15 was that 213 (47.0%) people were employed full-time, 75 (16.6%) were part-time, and 18 (4.0%) were unemployed.

Kaitake statistical area

Kaitake had a population of 1,932 at the 2018 New Zealand census, an increase of 300 people (18.4%) since the 2013 census, and an increase of 378 people (24.3%) since the 2006 census. There were 687 households, comprising 966 males and 972 females, giving a sex ratio of 0.99 males per female. The median age was 39.5 years (compared with 37.4 years nationally), with 471 people (24.4%) aged under 15 years, 270 (14.0%) aged 15 to 29, 969 (50.2%) aged 30 to 64, and 225 (11.6%) aged 65 or older.

Ethnicities were 94.7% European/Pākehā, 13.8% Māori, 0.8% Pacific peoples, 1.6% Asian, and 1.6% other ethnicities. People may identify with more than one ethnicity.

The percentage of people born overseas was 16.0, compared with 27.1% nationally.

Although some people chose not to answer the census's question about religious affiliation, 57.1% had no religion, 31.8% were Christian, 0.3% had Māori religious beliefs, 0.6% were Buddhist and 2.0% had other religions.

Of those at least 15 years old, 312 (21.4%) people had a bachelor's or higher degree, and 234 (16.0%) people had no formal qualifications. The median income was $34,600, compared with $31,800 nationally. 261 people (17.9%) earned over $70,000 compared to 17.2% nationally. The employment status of those at least 15 was that 771 (52.8%) people were employed full-time, 291 (19.9%) were part-time, and 51 (3.5%) were unemployed.

Education
It was initially called Okato Area School but changed its name.

Notable people
Dale Copeland, artist

References

Further reading

General historical works

Arts and literature

Business history

Churches

Anglican

Methodist

Maori

New Zealand wars
 The diaries of the local farmer Alexander Cassie are held at  Access to them is restricted, but they contain the reminiscences of veterans of the New Zealand Wars and the Parihaka incident. See

People
 The diaries of the local farmer Alexander Cassie are held at  Access to them is restricted, but they contain childhood reminiscences and incidents from the 1910s. See 
This collection contains research carried out on the Taranaki dairy industry, the missionary station of Johann Riemenschneider (and other matters), and can be seen at

Schools

Populated places in Taranaki
New Plymouth District